W. T. "Dub" Robinson Stadium was a tennis facility located on the campus of Louisiana State University in Baton Rouge, LA. The facility, built in 1976, served as the home of the LSU Tigers and LSU Lady Tigers tennis teams from 1976 to 2014. The stadium had a seating capacity of 550. It was named in honor of former standout head coach W.T. "Dub" Robinson, a coach that elevated the LSU tennis program to national prominence.

The facility provided six varsity tennis courts with an individual scoreboard on every court plus an additional six practice courts. The stadium also offered the Tigers and Lady Tigers state-of-the-art locker rooms, a meeting room, players lounge, media room and equipment room.

W.T. "Dub" Robinson Stadium was the site for both the 2007 SEC Tennis Championships and NCAA Regionals and was also home of the 2009 NCAA Regionals.

In 2015, the facility was replaced by the LSU Tennis Complex as the home venue for the tennis teams. The stadium was demolished in 2018 and the LSU Tigers women's beach volleyball stadium was built on the site.

See also
LSU Tigers and Lady Tigers
LSU Tennis Complex

References

External links
W. T. "Dub" Robinson Stadium at LSUSports.net

College tennis venues in the United States
LSU Tigers tennis venues
LSU Lady Tigers tennis venues
Tennis venues in Baton Rouge, Louisiana
1976 establishments in Louisiana
Sports venues completed in 1976
2014 disestablishments in Louisiana
Demolished sports venues in Louisiana
Sports venues demolished in 2018